Loricella is the scientific name of two genera of organisms and may refer to:

Loricella (chiton), a genus of molluscs in the family Loricidae
Loricella (fungus), a genus of fungi in the order Helotiales